The Serbian women's national 3x3 team ( / Ženska reprezentacija Srbije u basketu) represents Serbia in international 3x3 basketball matches and is controlled by the Basketball Federation of Serbia.

Competitions

Summer Olympics

3x3 World Cup

3x3 Europe Cup

European Games

Mediterranean Games

See also 
 Serbia men's national 3x3 team
 Serbia women's national basketball team

References

External links
 Basketball Federation of Serbia 

3
3x3 basketball in Serbia
Women's national 3x3 basketball teams
Women's basketball in Serbia